NGC 4658 is a spiral galaxy located in the constellation of Virgo. It was discovered by William Herschel on March 25, 1786.

References

External links 
 

Virgo (constellation)
Barred spiral galaxies
4658
042929